Archilagarinus is a genus of flies in the family Stratiomyidae.

Species
Archilagarinus priscus Enderlein, 1932

References

Stratiomyidae
Brachycera genera
Taxa named by Günther Enderlein
Diptera of Australasia